Africano, is a 2001 Egyptian adventure comedy film directed by Amr Arafa as his directorial feature debut and co-produced by director Amr Arafa himself with Hosam Ibrahim. The film stars Ahmed El Sakka and Mona Zaki in lead roles whereas Hasan Husni, Ahmed Eid, Nashwa Mustafa and Tal'at Zein made supportive roles.

The film was theatrically released and made its premier on 11 July 2001 in Egypt. The film received critical acclaim and later screened in nearby African countries as well as screened in Europe. In Kuwait, the film made its premier on 31 October 2001 whereas in Greece, it was released at the Greek Film Archive on 28 February 2012.

Cast
 Ahmed El Sakka as Badr
 Mona Zaki as Gamila
 Hasan Husni as Shakir 
 Ahmed Eid as Esam
 Nashwa Mustafa as Zainab 
 Tal'at Zein as Adam
 Sami Sarhan as Vet
 Suliman Eid as Policeman
 Nadia Al-Iraqia as Customer
 Bayhas Alirtemat as African Macho
 Hosam Ibrahim as African matcho
 Samir Chamas as Mr. Joe

References

External links
 
 Complete film in YouTube

2001 films
Egyptian action films
2001 comedy films
Films set in South Africa